Concubine Mao (1677 – October/November 1730), a member of the Han Chinese Song clan, was a consort of the Yongzheng Emperor.

Life

Family background 
Concubine Mao was a member of Han Chinese Song clan.

 Father: Jinzhu, served as sixth rank literary official (pinyin: zhushi)

Kangxi era 
The future Concubine Mao was born in 1677. In 1694, she entered a residence of Prince Yong of the First Rank, Yinzhen as a mistress. On 10 April 1694, she gave birth to first princess, who would die prematurely in May 1694. On 8 January 1707, she gave birth to third princess, who would die prematurely in February 1707.

Yongzheng era 
The Kangxi Emperor died on 20 December 1722 and was succeeded by Yinzhen, who was enthroned as the Yongzheng Emperor. The same year, Lady Song was conferred the title "Concubine Mao" (懋嫔; "mao" meaning "exquisite"). She was described as kind-hearted person and competent supervisor. She remained childless during Yongzheng era and was never promoted. Concubine Mao died in November 1730. Her coffin was temporarily placed in Tiancun Immortal palace and later interred at Tai Mausoleum of the Western Qing tombs.

Titles 
 During the reign of the Kangxi Emperor (r. 1661–1722):
 Lady Song (from 1677)
 Mistress (from 1694)
 During the reign of the Yongzheng Emperor (r. 1722–1735):
 Concubine Mao (from 1722), fifth rank consort

Issue 
 As mistress:
 First daughter (10 April 1694 – April/May 1694)
 Third daughter (8 January 1707 – January/February 1707)

See also
 Ranks of imperial consorts in China#Qing
 Royal and noble ranks of the Qing dynasty

References 

17th-century Chinese women
18th-century Chinese women
Consorts of the Yongzheng Emperor
1677 births 
1730 deaths